The 1957–58 Tennessee A&I State Tigers basketball team represented Tennessee A&I State College (now called Tennessee State University) in National Association of Intercollegiate Athletics (NAIA) men's basketball during the 1957–58 season. Coached by fourth-year head coach John McLendon, the Tigers finished the season with a 31–3 record and were crowned NAIA national champions by winning the 1958 NAIA tournament. This marked the second of three consecutive national championships, a feat that no other team at any level of college basketball had previously accomplished. In 2019, all three national championship teams were inducted into the Naismith Memorial Basketball Hall of Fame.

Individual honors
 Associated Press Little All-America – Dick Barnett
 NAIA All-America – Dick Barnett, John Barnhill
 NAIA Tournament MVP – Dick Barnett

References

Tennessee State Tigers basketball seasons
Tennessee AandI
NAIA men's basketball tournament championship seasons
Naismith Memorial Basketball Hall of Fame inductees
Tennessee AandI State Basketball Team
Tennessee AandI State Basketball Team